José Ramírez de Arellano, also José Ramírez Benavides, ( 1705 – March 27, 1770), was a Spanish Baroque architect and sculptor.

Early life
Ramírez was a member of a family of artists from Aragon. He was the son of the sculptor Juan Ramírez Mejandre, and brother of sculptor Manuel Ramírez de Arellano and painter Juan Ramírez de Arellano. He was director of the first Academy of Drawing of Aragon, founded by his father in 1714, where he was assisted by prominent artists of Zaragoza, as José Luzán who taught Francisco Goya in his first apprenticeship.

Career

In 1740 Ramírez was appointed Sculptor to the King (Charles III of Spain). In 1751 he was commissioned to manage the works of Basilica of Our Lady of the Pillar, where he met several renowned artists of that time who were hired to assist in its construction, including the painter Antonio González Velázquez (commissioned to paint the dome above the temple), and Ventura Rodríguez, who delegated almost entirely to Ramírez the building of the tabernacle. From 1752 he moved his home and workshop to Zaragoza which was run by him and his brother Manuel.

Later years
In 1755, Ramírez married Michelle Heras Diego and with whom he had three children who reached adulthood. He became the Royal Academician of the Real Academia de Bellas Artes de San Fernando in 1758. He died in Zaragoza in 1770.

External links and references
 Ramirez Family in the Great Aragon Encyclopedia (Spanish)

1705 births
1770 deaths
18th-century Spanish sculptors
18th-century Spanish male artists
18th-century Spanish architects
People from Zaragoza
Spanish Baroque sculptors
Spanish male sculptors